Kamareh or Kamarah may refer to:
Kamareh, Kermanshah
Kamareh-ye Gharbi, Kermanshah Province
Kamareh-ye Olya, Kermanshah Province
Kamareh-ye Sofla, Kermanshah Province
Kamareh, Kurdistan
Kamareh, Lorestan
Kamareh, Markazi
Kamareh District
Kamareh-ye Bala
Kamareh-ye Hashem Beg
Kamareh-ye Heshmatabad
Kamareh-ye Mishnan